Bistinda is a genus of flies in the family Stratiomyidae.

Distribution
Fiji.

Species
Bistinda castanea Bezzi, 1928

References

Stratiomyidae
Brachycera genera
Taxa named by Mario Bezzi
Diptera of Australasia
Insects of Fiji